Schizostachyum is a tall or shrub-like tropical genus of bamboo. They are natives mostly of tropical Asia and Papuasia, with a few species in Madagascar and on certain islands in the Pacific. A few have become naturalized in other tropical regions.

Description

These are clumping, sometimes climbing woody bamboos, with terete culm-internodes and short, thick (pachymorph), perennial rhizomes.

Species
The following are included in Plants of the World Online:

formerly included
see Bambusa Cephalostachyum Cyrtochloa Dendrocalamus Dinochloa Eremocaulon Gigantochloa Nastus Neohouzeaua Pseudostachyum Pseudoxytenanthera Sirochloa 

Some also include the genus Leptocanna in this genus.

References

External links

Bambusoideae
Bambusoideae genera